Shootash was, before WWI, originally an area consisting of a few farmsteads, woodland and common land which subsequently developed during the 20th century into a small hamlet along the main A27 Romsey to Whiteparish road, lying within the northern boundary of the civil parish of Wellow, in the Test Valley district of Hampshire, England. Its nearest town is Romsey, which lies approximately 2.5 miles (4.1 km) south-east from the hamlet. The village of Wellow (also known as West Wellow) lies approximately 2 miles (3 km) south-west from the hamlet. At the 2011 Census the population of Shootash was included in the civil parish, of Wellow.

Villages in Hampshire
Test Valley